The following lists events that happened during 1959 in Singapore.

Incumbents
 Governor of Singapore
Sir William Allmond Codrington Goode  ( until 2 June)
 Yang di-Pertuan Negara
 Sir William Allmond Codrington Goode (from 3 June to 2 December)
 Yusof Ishak (from 3 December)
  Chief Minister – Lim Yew Hock (until June 3)
 Prime Minister – Lee Kuan Yew (from 5 June)
 Chief Secretary: Edgeworth Beresford David (till 2 June)

Events

May
30 May – The 1959 General Elections was held. Lee Kuan Yew was elected as Prime Minister of Singapore.

June
3 June – The 1958 State of Singapore Constitution is adopted, allowing for self-governance in Singapore.
5 June – The first Cabinet is sworn into power.
8 June – A campaign against decadent lifestyles is launched.
20 June – The Ministry of National Development will start a team with seven Assembly members from 22 June, with many departments to be consolidated under MND. The Singapore Improvement Trust will also be brought under the Ministry in future.
25 June – The Ministry of National Development forms the Primary Production Department to better serve farmers and fishermen.

October
23 October – Various departments of the City Council and Rural Board will be absorbed into the Ministry of National Development, Ministry of Health and Ministry of Labour and Law.

December
3 December – Encik Yusof bin Ishak is sworn in as Singapore's second Yang di-Pertuan Negara. On the same day, the National Flag of Singapore, the Coat of arms of Singapore and the national anthem, Majulah Singapura, are unveiled.
12–17 December – Singapore participates in the 1959 Southeast Asian Peninsular Games, the first SEAP event. It came in fourth with 33 medals.

Births
 9 February – Gan Kim Yong, Minister for Trade and Industry.
 26 February – Lim Hwee Hua, former politician, first woman in Singapore's Cabinet.
 26 March – K. Shanmugam, Minister for Home Affairs and Minister for Law.
 24 June – Raymond Lim, former politician.

See also
List of years in Singapore
1959 Singaporean general election
1959

References

 
Singapore
Years in Singapore